John Orr (born 7 January 1858 in Benburb, County Tyrone, Ireland, d. 30 June 1932 in Dublin, Ireland) was an Irish South African businessman who founded the department store John Orr's, eventually sold to Mr. Price.

Biography
Orr emigrated to South Africa in 1883, at age 25. He worked for Garlicks department store in Cape Town and then opened his own store in that city. In 1885, he moved to Kimberley and opened a drapery (in South African parlance, clothing and fabrics) store on Jones Street (now Phakamile Mabija Street) for many decades. John Orr's opened branches across South Africa as well as Lourenço Marques (now Maputo, Mozambique). In 1951, it became a public company with 2,500 employees.

Other work and honours
Source: "Today in Kimberley's History"
Mayor of Kimberley (1909–1910 and 1916–1918)
MBE (Member of the Order of the British Empire), 1918
Board member of the Alexander McGregor Memorial Museum
Founder, Kimberley Horticultural Society

Personal life
John Orr was born to Dickson and Letitia Orr and educated in Ireland. In 1892, he married Mary Ellen Harper, with whom he had three sons and two daughters.

Orr's house on Lodge Road, Dunluce, or Lillienville as it was first known, was designed by D. W. Greatbatch for Gustav Bonas, a diamond buyer, in 1897. In 1902, Orr bought the house for the sum of £6 400, and gave it the name Dunluce. In 1974, Barlow Duce bought the house, restored it and donated it to the McGregor Museum.

Patrick Lambie, the Springbok rugby player, is a Orr's great-great-grandson; Orr's granddaughter is Lambie's grandmother, Alizanne Labuschagne, whose husband was Nic Labuschagne of KwaZulu-Natal rugby and a Scotland rugby International.

References

Orr, John
Orr, John
Orr, John